The House of Fortescue is a 1916 British silent drama film directed by Frank Wilson and starring Stewart Rome, Violet Hopson and Lionelle Howard. An Australian millionaire marries a woman to help save her father's business from ruin.

Cast
 Stewart Rome as Fortescue 
 Violet Hopson as Ceclie Harding 
 Lionelle Howard as Gerald Harding 
 Harry Gilbey as Charles Harding 
 Charles Vane as Jasper Mason

References

Bibliography
 Palmer, Scott. British Film Actors' Credits, 1895-1987. McFarland, 1988.

External links

1916 films
1916 drama films
British drama films
British silent feature films
Films directed by Frank Wilson
Films set in England
Hepworth Pictures films
British black-and-white films
1910s English-language films
1910s British films
Silent drama films